

Friedrich-Wilhelm Morzik (10 December 1891 – 17 June 1985) was a general in the Luftwaffe of Nazi Germany during World War II.   He was a recipient of the Knight's Cross of the Iron Cross.

Morzik was a winner in the first International Tourist Plane Contest Challenge and the second Challenge in 1930. In 1935 he started service in the Air Force (Luftwaffe), as a commandant of pilots' school. In World War II he became a head of Luftwaffe Transport Command, in a rank of Generalmajor.

After the war he wrote a detailed story of German transport aviation during the war: Die deutschen Transportflieger im Zweiten Weltkrieg (Frankfurt am Main, 1966) and German Air Force Airlift Operations (New York: Arno Press, 1968).

Awards and decorations

 Knight's Cross of the Iron Cross on 16 April 1942 as Oberst and Geschwaderkommodore of Kampfgeschwader z.b.V. 1 and Lufttransportführer Ost of Luftflotte 1

References

Citations

Bibliography

External links

1891 births
1985 deaths
Luftwaffe World War II generals
People from Szczytno County
People from East Prussia
German Army personnel of World War I
Prussian Army personnel
Recipients of the clasp to the Iron Cross, 1st class
Recipients of the Knight's Cross of the Iron Cross
German prisoners of war in World War II held by the United States
Luftstreitkräfte personnel
Major generals of the Luftwaffe